Seongsan, Changwon is a constituency of the National Assembly of South Korea. The constituency consists of Seongsan, Changwon, South Gyeongsang Province. As of 2019, 183,934 eligible voters were registered in the constituency.

List of members of the National Assembly

Election results

2019 (by-election)

2016

2012

References 

Constituencies of the National Assembly (South Korea)